Abdullah Al-Yousef (born 16 September 1989) is a Saudi professional footballer who currently plays as a left back for Saudi Professional League club Al-Adalah .

External links
 

Saudi Arabian footballers
Al Jeel Club players
Hajer FC players
Al-Adalah FC players
1989 births
Living people
Saudi First Division League players
Saudi Professional League players
Association football fullbacks
Saudi Arabian Shia Muslims